People Get Ready - A Tribute to Curtis Mayfield is a compilation album of various artists, celebrating the music of Curtis Mayfield.

Track listing
 "Um, Um, Um, Um, Um, Um" – Don Covay & Angela Strehli
 "He Will Break Your Heart" – Delbert McClinton
 "Choice of Colors" – Jerry Butler	
 "People Get Ready" – David Sanborn & Jonathan Sanborn
 "Got a Right to Cry" – Angela Strehli	
 "It's All Right" – Huey Lewis and the News
 "We People Who Are Darker Than Blue" – Michael Hill & Vernon Reid
 "I Gotta Keep on Moving" – Bunny Wailer	
 "You Must Believe Me" – Don Covay	
 "I'm So Proud" – Steve Cropper & Lani Groves
 "Gypsy Woman" – Kim Wilson

Personnel 
Will Calhoun – drums
Steve Cropper – guitar
Paul Griffin – keyboards
Jonathan Sanborn – bass
The Uptown Horns: Crispin Cioe (as, bs),  Arno Hecht (ts), Bob Funk (tb), Larry Etkin (tp)

References

External links 

https://secondhandsongs.com/release/5533

Curtis Mayfield tribute albums
1993 compilation albums
Rhythm and blues compilation albums